C. Maurice Patterson also known as Pat or Maurice Patterson (24 December 1913 – 21 May 1989) a pioneer in the establishment of health physics as a profession.

Health Physics Society
Patterson was a key member in the formation of the Health Physics Society and represented the Savannah River Project.
Founding member and Director 
Representative from Savannah River Project
President, 1962
Founders Award, 1979
Fellow, 1984
Diplomat, American Board of Health Physics

Publications
Patterson, C. M. (1958). Proceedings U. N. Intern. Conf. Peaceful Uses Atomic Energy, 2nd, Geneva, 23: 295.
Monitoring of tritium in gases, liquids, and in the environment.
Environmental Radiation at the Start

References

1913 births
1989 deaths
20th-century American physicists
DuPont people
Savannah River
Oak Ridge National Laboratory people
Health physicists
Health Physics Society
People from Aiken, South Carolina